Richard Barry (4 September 1919 – 28 April 2013) was an Irish Fine Gael politician. A publican before entering politics, he first stood for election in the Cork East constituency at the 1951 general election, but was unsuccessful. He was elected to Dáil Éireann at a by-election in 1953 following the death of the Labour Party Teachta Dála (TD) Seán Keane. He was re-elected at each subsequent election until he retired at the 1981 general election. From 1961 he was elected for the Cork North-East constituency.

In 1973, he was appointed a Parliamentary Secretary to the Minister for Health on the nomination of Taoiseach Liam Cosgrave and served till 1977. His daughter Myra Barry was elected in a by-election in 1979 for the same constituency of Cork North-East. This is the only time a parent and child have been represented in the same constituency in the same Dáil.

See also
Families in the Oireachtas

References

1919 births
2013 deaths
Fine Gael TDs
Members of the 14th Dáil
Members of the 15th Dáil
Members of the 16th Dáil
Members of the 17th Dáil
Members of the 18th Dáil
Members of the 19th Dáil
Members of the 20th Dáil
Members of the 21st Dáil
Politicians from County Cork
Parliamentary Secretaries of the 20th Dáil
People from Fermoy